Reactionary Situation is a 2002 painting by the German artist Neo Rauch. It depicts a rural landscape with poplars, a dilapidated manor house, a little girl, a man working the ground with a stick, a man praying on his knees before a floating windmill and a colourful rifle mounted on the ground.

Provenance
The painting was exhibited at Galerie Eigen+Art in Berlin in 2002–03. It was bought by a private collector in 2002. In February 2015 it was sold through Christie's for £938,500 ($1,429,336), having been estimated to be worth £600,000–£800,000 ($913,800–$1,218,400).

Reception
Frank Zöllner of Die Zeit wrote that Reactionary Situation is one of few Neo Rauch paintings where the landscape can be located to an existing place, as he associated the old poplars, the manor house with modern extensions and the unusual cloud formations with the Zöbigker and Gaschwitz areas in Markkleeberg. Katrin Wittneven wrote in Der Tagesspiegel that "the picture shows multiple perspectives simultaneously, which reinforces the surreal impression", and that although Rauch's titles often "give a direction for the viewer, they do not pursue any clear goal".

References

2002 paintings
Paintings by Neo Rauch